Aura Mayfair was a nightclub located on St James's Street in Mayfair, London.

In 2010, Tony Fernandes led a consortium that took over the club. The club was owned by Merlot 73 Ltd, in which Fernandes had a 30% stake, and run by Alberto Barbieri.

Notable guests included Rihanna, James Arthur, Drake, Ne-Yo, Tamara Ecclestone and Usher. In January 2011, Madonna was rumoured to be buying into the club after numerous visits and meetings with owners.

Merlot 73 Ltd went into liquidation and was dissolved on 27 July 2016.

References

External links

 Aura Mayfair Guestlist & Tables booking service.
 Aura Guestlist

Nightclubs in London
Buildings and structures in Mayfair
Event venues established in 2010
2010 establishments in England
2016 disestablishments in England
British companies established in 2010
British companies disestablished in 2016